The term Orthodox Christianity in Jordan may refer to:

 Eastern Orthodox Christianity in Jordan, representing communities and institutions of Eastern Orthodox Church, in Jordan
 Oriental Orthodox Christianity in Jordan, representing communities and institutions of Oriental Orthodox Church, in Jordan

See also
 Orthodox Christianity (disambiguation)
 Jordan (disambiguation)